Charles Inigo Sutcliffe (July 22, 1915 – March 2, 1994) was a Major League Baseball player. He played one season with the Boston Bees in 1938.

References

External links

Boston Bees players
Major League Baseball catchers
1915 births
1994 deaths
Baseball players from Massachusetts
Sportspeople from Fall River, Massachusetts
Hartford Bees players
Quebec Athletics players
Bradford Bees players